Rae Dawn Chong (born February 28, 1961) is a Canadian-American actress. She made her big screen debut appearing in the 1978 musical drama film Stony Island, and in 1981 starred in the fantasy film Quest for Fire, for which she received Genie Award for Best Actress.

Chong later starred in films Beat Street (1984), American Flyers (1985), The Color Purple (1985), Commando (1985), Soul Man (1986), The Principal (1987), Tales from the Darkside (1990), Time Runner (1993), and Boulevard (1994). She is the daughter of comedian and actor Tommy Chong.

Early life
Chong was born on February 28, 1961, in Edmonton, Alberta, Canada, the first daughter of actor/comedian Tommy Chong. Her father is of Chinese and Scots-Irish descent and her birth mother, Gail Lewis, was of Black Canadian descent. Her sister Robbi Chong, by Maxine Sneed, is a model and actress. They have three younger half-brothers (one adopted) and a half-sister by their father's second wife. In addition to Rae Dawn, two of her sisters and her adopted brother Marcus Chong have pursued acting careers.

Chong has said that her paternal grandfather left a poor village in China in the 1930s to live with an aunt in Vancouver, where Chinese immigrants were mostly sequestered in a small area due to racial discrimination, and that although he spoke Cantonese, he refused to teach it to his children or grandchildren. She said, "I think my grandfather had great racial shame, which was hard on us growing up. ... We grew up desperate to know anything about our Chinese culture." Later in life, though, her grandfather "saw the error of his ways and embraced his heritage."

Career
After acting in a few television roles, Chong's second feature film was Quest for Fire (1981), for which she won the Genie Award for Best Performance by an Actress in a Leading Role in 1983. Other notable roles have been in the films Choose Me (1984), Beat Street (1984), The Color Purple (1985), and Commando (1985). She appeared with her father in Cheech & Chong's The Corsican Brothers (1984) and Far Out Man (1990). In 1985, Chong played the love interest in Mick Jagger's video "Just Another Night". 

At 19 years old, Chris Pratt was waiting tables at the Bubba Gump Shrimp Company restaurant in Maui when he was scouted by Chong; she cast him in her directorial debut, the short horror film Cursed Part 3, which was filmed in Los Angeles in 2000.

On television, Chong starred opposite Adrian Pasdar in the science fiction drama series Mysterious Ways from 2000 to 2002. later she starred in the first season of Lifetime comedy-drama series Wild Card opposite Joely Fisher. The following years, she appeared in a number of independent movies. She returned to television appearing in two episodes of Better Things in 2016, and two episodes of 9-1-1 (2018-19). In 2021, she played Betty Currie in the FX series Impeachment: American Crime Story.

In 2021, Chong was honored with the "Invisible Woman Award" from the Women Film Critics Circle for "Supporting performance by a woman whose exceptional impact on the film dramatically, socially or historically, has been ignored" for her performance in the drama film The Sleeping Negro.

In 2022, Chong portrayed Florence de Pointe du Lac in the AMC series Interview with the Vampire.

Personal life
Chong married Owen Bayliss, a stockbroker, and they had a son named Morgan. They divorced in 1982. In 1989, she married  actor C. Thomas Howell, her co-star in the feature film Soul Man. They divorced in 1990. In 2011, Chong married Nathan Ulrich (one of the founders of Xootr). They divorced in 2014.

Pop culture references 
British-American rapper-producer MF DOOM recorded a song titled "Rae Dawn". It was released under the alias Viktor Vaughn, as a single from his third studio album Vaudeville Villain (some releases list the title as "Raedawn"). The reference to Chong appears in the lyrics: "New drink, named it after Chong daughter". 

Comedian Stephen Lynch also has a song about Chong—"R.D.C. (Opie's Lament)"—as the 12th track on his 2000 debut album A Little Bit Special. 

In "Love Song" by Alice in Chains (hidden track on their 1992 EP Sap), the name "Rae Dawn Chong" is repeated several times.

In the television show Psych, the main characters Shawn and Gus have a "bi-annual Rae Dawn Chong marathon".

Filmography

Film

Television

References

External links 
 
 
 

1961 births
Living people
20th-century Canadian actresses
21st-century Canadian actresses
Actresses from Edmonton
Best Actress Genie and Canadian Screen Award winners
Black Canadian actresses
Canadian child actresses
Canadian emigrants to the United States
Canadian film actresses
Canadian people of Chinese descent
Canadian people of French descent
Canadian people of Ulster-Scottish descent
Canadian television actresses